Compounding treason is an offence under the common law of England. It is committed by anyone who agrees for consideration to abstain from prosecuting the offender who has committed treason.

It is still an offence in England and Wales, and in Northern Ireland. It has been abolished in the Republic of Ireland.

In 1977, the Law Commission recommended that the offence should be abolished for England and Wales and for Northern Ireland.

See also
 Compounding a felony
 High treason in the United Kingdom
 Misprision of treason

References

Common law offences in England and Wales
English law
Inchoate offenses
Treason in the United Kingdom